John Wollaston Anglican Community School is an independent Anglican co-educational primary and secondary day school, located in Camillo, Perth, Western Australia.

The school was founded in 1989 and offers K-12 education. The school contains over 1,000 students with four different house groups, Hale (blue), Charter (green), Scott (yellow), Ramsden (red). In 2014, a new technology centre was opened.

The current Head of School is Anne Ford. The school is named in honour of John Ramsden Wollaston.

References

External links 
 John Wollaston Official Website

Anglican primary schools in Perth, Western Australia
Anglican Schools Commission
Anglican secondary schools in Perth, Western Australia
Educational institutions established in 1989
1989 establishments in Australia